The Panizzi Lectures are a series of annual lectures given at the British Library by "eminent scholars of the book" and named after the librarian Anthony Panizzi. They are considered one of the major British bibliographical lecture series alongside the Sandars Lectures at the University of Cambridge and the Lyell Lectures at Oxford University. 

Each year, a different book historian delivers three lectures on a topic of their choice, "pertaining to bibliography whether concerning the subjects of palaeography, codicology, typography, bookbinding, book illustration, music, cartography, historical critical and analytical bibliography, or any subject relating directly or indirectly to any of the above subjects". The Panizzi Council, a body of book historians and professionals working in allied fields, chooses speakers three years in advance of each set of lectures. 

The series is usually delivered in the winter or fall. A few recent lectures have been recorded, and most of the talks see subsequent publication as scholarly monographs (see individual entries below).

Lectures

2020s series  
 2024 — Elizabeth McHenry
 2023 — Henry Woudhuysen
 2022 — Jeffrey F. Hamburger — Drawing Conclusions: Diagrams in Medieval Art and Thought
 Lecture 1 (24 Oct 2022): Maps of the Mind: Diagrams Medieval and Modern
 Lecture 2 (27 Oct 2022): The Classroom and the Codex: Practical Dimensions of Medieval Diagrams
 Lecture 3 (01 Nov 2022): Poetry, Play, Persuasion: The Diagrammatic Imagination
 2021 — Cynthia Brokaw — ‘Spreading Culture Throughout the Land’: Woodblock Publishing and Chinese Book Culture in the Early Modern Era
 Lecture 1 (30 Nov 2021): Woodblock Publishing in China's First Age of Print
 Lecture 2 (02 Dec 2021): The Publishing Boom of Early Modern China and Late-Ming Book Culture
 Lecture 3 (uncertain): The Expansion of Woodblock Publishing and the Rise of the Common Reader 
 2020 — Series postponed to 2021

2010s series  
 2019 — Ann Blair — Paratexts and Print in Renaissance Humanism
 Lecture 1 (2019 Dec 09): The Impact of Printing on Paratexts 
 Lecture 2 (2019 Dec 10): Experiments in Humanist Paratexts
 Lecture 3 (2019 Dec 12): The Limits of Paratexts

 2018 — Laurie Maguire — The Rhetoric of the Page: Reading Blank Space 
 Lecture 1 (2018 Nov 20): Reading Blank Space
 Lecture 2 (2018 Nov 27): Reading &c
 Lecture 3 (2018 Dec 04): Reading *

 2017 — Germaine Greer — The Poetry of Sappho 
 Lecture 1 (04 Dec 2017): The Witnesses 
 Lecture 2 (07 Dec 2017): The Glory 
 Lecture 3 (11 Dec 2017): The Shame 

 2016 — Rowan Williams — British Libraries: The Literary World of Post-Roman Britain 
 Lecture 1 (10 Oct 2016): Gildas and the Invention of Britain
 Lecture 2 (12 Oct 2016): Bede and the Invention of England
 Lecture 3 (17 Oct 2016): Nennius and the Invention of Wales

 2015 — David McKitterick — The Invention of Rare Books 
 Lecture 1 (02 Nov 2015): A Seventeenth-Century Revolution
 Lecture 2 (05 Nov 2015): Selling the Harleian Library
 Lecture 3 (09 Nov 2015): Private Interest and Public Responsibility
 Published as: McKitterick, David. The Invention of Rare Books: Private Interest and Public Memory, 1600–1840. Cambridge: Cambridge University Press, 2018.

 2014 — Christopher de Hamel — The Giant Bibles of Twelfth-Century England 
 Lecture 1 (27 Oct 2014): The Bury Bible 
 Lecture 2 (30 Oct 2014): The Winchester Bible 
 Lecture 3 (03 Nov 2014): The Lambeth Bible 

 2013 — Robert Darnton — Censors at Work: Bourbon France, Imperialist India, and Communist East Germany 
 Lecture 1 (06 Jan 2014): Bourbon France: Privilege and Repression
 Lecture 2 (07 Jan 2014): British India: Liberalism and Imperialism
 Lecture 3 (09 Jan 2014): Communist East Germany: Planning and Persecution
 Published as: Darnton, Robert. Censors at Work: How States Shaped Literature. New York: W.W. Norton & Company, 2014. 

 2012 — Brian Richardson — Women, Books, and Communities in Renaissance Italy
 Lecture 1 (15 Oct 2012): Circulating Books 
 Lecture 2 (22 Oct 2012): Making and Selling Books 
 Lecture 3 (29 Oct 2012): Acquiring Books 
 Published as: Richardson, Brian F. Women and the Circulation of Texts in Renaissance Italy. Cambridge: Cambridge University Press, 2020. 

 2011 — Robert D. Hume and Judith Milhous — The Publication of Plays in Eighteenth-Century London: Playwrights, Publishers, and the Market 
 Lecture 1 (24 Oct 2011): Money and Readers 
 Lecture 2 (25 Oct 2011): Playwrights 
 Lecture 3 (31 Oct 2011): Publishers, Illustrations, and Tactics 
 Published as: Milhous, Judith, and Robert D. Hume. The Publication of Plays in London: 1660–1800; Playwrights, Publishers, and the Market. The Panizzi Lectures 2011. London: British Library, 2015. 

 2010 — James Raven — London Booksites: Places of Printing and Publication before 1800
 Lecture 1 (27 Oct 2010): Antient Shops and Conversible Men 
 Lecture 2 (03 Nov 2010): Versatility and the Gloomy Stores of Literature
 Lecture 3 (10 Nov 2010): Industry, Fashion, and Pettyfogging Drivellers
 Published as: Raven, James. Bookscape: Geographies of Printing and Publishing in London before 1800. The Panizzi Lectures 2010. London: British Library, 2014.

2000s series  
 2009 — Anthony Grafton — The Culture of Correction in Renaissance Europe
 Published as: Grafton, Anthony. The Culture of Correction in Renaissance Europe. The Panizzi Lectures 2009. London: British Library, 2011. 
 2008 — Nicholas Pickwoad — Reading Bindings: Bindings as Evidence of the Culture and Business of Books
 2007 — Jonathan J. G. Alexander — Italian Renaissance Illuminated Manuscripts in the Collections of the British Library
 2006 — Christopher Pinney — The Coming of Photography to India
 Published as: Pinney, Christopher. The Coming of Photography to India. The Panizzi Lectures 2006. London: British Library, 2008. 
 2005 — Will Ryan — The Magic of Russia
 Published as: Ryan, William F. Russian Magic Books in the British Library: Books, Manuscripts, Scholars and Travellers. The Panizzi Lectures 2005. London: British Library, 2006. 
 2004 — María Luisa López-Vidriero — The Polished Cornerstones of the Temple: Queenly Libraries of the Enlightenment
 Published as: López-Vidriero, María Luisa. Polished Cornerstones of the Temple: Queenly Libraries of the Enlightenment. The Panizzi Lectures 2004. London: British Library, 2005. 
 2003 — Antony Griffiths — Prints for Books: French Book Illustration 1760–1800
 Published as: Griffiths, Anthony. Prints for Books: Book Illustration in France 1760-1800. The Panizzi Lectures 2003. London: British Library, 2004. 
 2002 — Christopher Ricks — T. S. Eliot's Revisions after Publication
 Published as: Ricks, Christopher. Decisions and Revisions in T. S. Eliot. The Panizzi Lectures 2002. London: British Library, 2003. 
 2001 — Nicolas Barker — ‘Things not reveal’d’: The Mutual Impact of Idea and Form in the Transmission of Verse 2000 B.C.–A.D. 1500
 Published as: Barker, Nicholas. Things Not Reveal'd Manifestations of Verse from Antiquity to the End of the Middle Ages—The Panizzi Lectures. London: British Library, 2002. 
 2000 — Michael Twyman — Breaking the Mould: The First Hundred Years of Lithography
 Published as: Twyman, Michael. Breaking the Mould: The First Hundred Years of Lithography. The Panizzi Lectures 2000. London: British Library, 2001.

1990s series 
 1999 — Glen Dudbridge — Lost Books of Medieval China
 Published as: Dudbridge, Glen. Lost Books of Medieval China. The Panizzi Lectures. London: British Library, 2000. 
 1998 — Roger Chartier — Publishing Drama in Early Modern Europe
 Published as: Chartier, Roger. Publishing Drama in Early Modern Europe. The Panizzi Lectures 1998. London: British Library, 1999. 
 1997 — Mirjam M. Foot — The History of Bookbinding as a Mirror of Society
 Published as: Foot, Mirjam. A History of Bookbinding as a Mirror of Society: 1997 Panizzi Lectures. Toronto: University of Toronto Press, 1999. 
 1996 — Charles Burnett — The Introduction of Arabic Learning into England
 Published as: Burnett, Charles. Introduction of Arabic Learning into England. The Panizzi Lectures 1996. London: British Library, 1997. 
 1995 — David Woodward — Maps as Prints in the Italian Renaissance: Makers, Distributors, and Consumers
 Published as: Woodward, David. Maps as Prints in the Italian Renaissance. The Panizzi Lectures 1995. London: British Library, 1996. 
 1994 — Iain Fenlon — Music, Print, and Culture in Early Sixteenth-Century Italy
 Published as: Fenlon, Iain. Music, Print and Culture in Early Sixteenth-Century Italy. The Panizzi Lectures 1994. London: British Library, 1995. 
 1993 — Colin G. C. Tite — The Manuscript Library of Sir Robert Cotton
 Published as: Tite, Colin G.C. The Manuscript Library of Sir Robert Cotton. The Panizzi Lectures 1993. London: British Library, 1994. 
 1992 —  — Hebrew Manuscripts of East and West: Towards a Comparative Codicology
 Published as: Beit-Arié, Malachi. Hebrew Manuscripts of East and West: Towards a Comparative Codicology. The Panizzi Lectures 1992. London: British Library, 1993. 
 1991 —  — The English Book in Eighteenth-Century Germany
 Published as: Fabian, Bernhard. The English Book in Eighteenth-Century Germany. The Panizzi Lectures 1991. London: British Library, 1992. 
 1990 — J. B. Trapp — Erasmus, Colet, and More: The Early Tudor Humanists and Their Books
 Published as: Trapp, J.B. Erasmus, Colet, and More: The Early Tudor Humanists and Their Books. The Panizzi Lectures 1990. London: British Library, 1991.

1980s series  
 1989 — J. P. Gumbert — The Dutch and Their Books in the Manuscript Age
 Published as: Gumbert, J.P. The Dutch and Their Books in the Manuscript Age. The Panizzi Lectures 1989. London: British Library, 1990. 
 1988 — Giles Barber — Daphnis and Chloë: The Markets and Metamorphoses of an Unknown Bestseller
 Published as: Barber, Giles. Daphnis and Chloe: The Markets and Metamorphoses of an Unknown Bestseller. The Panizzi Lectures 1988. London: British Library, 1989. 
 1987 — K. W. Humphreys — A National Library in Theory and in Practice
 Published as: Humphreys, K.W. A National Library in Theory and in Practice. The Panizzi Lectures 1987. London: British Library, 1988. 
 1986 — T. A. Birrell — English Monarchs and Their Books: From Henry VII to Charles II
 Published as: Birrell, T.A. English Monarchs and Their Books: From Henry VII to Charles II. The Panizzi Lectures 1986. London: British Library, 1987. 
 1985 — D. F. McKenzie — Bibliography and the Sociology of Texts
 Published as: McKenzie, D.F. Bibliography and the Sociology of Texts. The Panizzi Lectures 1985. London: The British Library, 1986.

See also
 E. A. Lowe Lectures
 McKenzie Lectures

References 

British lecture series
Textual scholarship